The Church of St. Mary of the Angels is a Roman Catholic church in Singapore completed in 2004. It is located in the Bukit Batok Planning Area, within the West Region of Singapore. The church is home to both a parish community and Franciscan monastery. Currently, the parish is home to some 8,500 parishioners.

History 
It grew out of the work of a group of Franciscan friars in the 1950s. The building was awarded the Singapore Institute of Architects Religious Building category award in 2004, and Design of the Year award at the first President's Design Award in 2006. It was designed by Singapore-based WOHA Architects.

With effect from 2020, the newly appointed Parish Priest is Friar Michael D’Cruz OFM, with the assistance of two other priests, Friar Esmond Chua OFM, and Friar Gerard Victor OFM, with Friar John-Paul Tan, OFM, JCL, being the chancellor of the Archdiocese of Singapore, and Friar Derrick Yap, OFM, being appointed as Custos, or Regional Superior of the Franciscans in Malaysia Singapore and Brunei.

The "Last Chance" Mass
Over the years, the parish had rapid growth in the number of parishioners, which resulted in most of the weekend Masses being very crowded. In 2011, the 5.30pm Mass on Sunday became just as crowded as the Sunday Morning Masses. The parish saw the need to add in a new Mass timing to cater to the crowd. With that, the Sunday 7.15pm Mass started, with the initial aim to cater to the crowd. It now caters to many parishioners, as well as people who are on shift work and are unable to attend Mass at any other timing on Sundays. The mass timing has since changed to 7.00pm.

See also
Christianity in Singapore
Roman Catholicism in Singapore
Archdiocese of Singapore
List of Roman Catholic churches in Singapore

References

External links

Mary of the Angels
WOHA